BHL may refer to:

Ice hockey
Belarusian Extraleague
Bosnia and Herzegovina Hockey League
British Hockey League

Others
Bernard-Henri Lévy, French intellectual
Bibliotheca Hagiographica Latina, a hagiographical sourcebook
Biodiversity Heritage Library, a consortium of libraries
Bilateral hilar lymphadenopathy